Acianthera cachensis is a species of orchid native to Costa Rica. It was first formally named Pleurothallis cachensis in 1923 and transferred to the genus Acianthera in 2016.

References

cachensis
Endemic flora of Costa Rica